Lake Yonozero is a large freshwater lake on the Kola Peninsula, Murmansk Oblast, Russia. Numerous small, uninhabited islands are found in the lake. Varzina River flows from the lake. Lake Yonozero marks the northern border of the Murmansk Tundra Reserve. The three-spined stickleback can be found in the lake, as well as in other surrounding lakes and rivers in eastern Murman.

References 

Lakes of Murmansk Oblast
Varzina basin